The Anna Scher Theatre is an independent and co-educational performing arts school based in Islington, Greater London. It was founded in 1968 by Anna Scher. It is considered among the first schools of its kind geared towards working class students.

Anna Scher
Anna Valerie Scher, was born on 26 December 1944 in Cork, Ireland, to Irish Jewish parents, Claire Hurwitz, and Eric Asher Scher, a dentist of Lithuanian descent. After starting out as an actress, her father told her to get a proper job, so she became a journalist specialising in theatre with the Islington Gazette for five years, and reviewed for The Times Literary Supplement.

Scher's philosophy is based on promoting love, peace and understanding through both learning and professionalism. Her heroes are Martin Luther King Jr., Anne Frank, Nelson Mandela and Winston Churchill. She frequently shares with her pupils various meaningful words or sayings which she calls Winston words after Churchill, but which are not necessarily attributed to him. 

In the past, Scher was chairperson of the International Song Contest for Peace also in Ireland, and served on the juries at BAFTA, the Sony Awards and the Royal Television Society. As an actress, she appeared in The Battle of St. George Without (1969), You Must Be Joking! (1974) and Anna (2011).

Scher is married to Charles Verrall, an acting and public speaking coach who has also written and directed several stage plays and a musical.  He was co-director of the Anna Scher Theatre for many years, and co-authored several of Scher's books on acting. They have one son.

Since founding the school in 1968, Scher has been awarded:
Community award from the Irish Post
Woman of Distinction Award from Jewish Care
Peace Person of the Year Award, Ireland, 1999
Associate of RADA
Honorary Fellow of the Leinster School of Music & Drama
Patron of Neve Shalom/Wahat al Salam – Oasis of Peace. 
Freedom of the London Borough of Islington, March 2003.
Member of the Order of the British Empire (MBE), 2013, appointed in the Queen's Birthday Honours List for her services to Drama.

Theatre school
In 1968, Scher started an extracurricular performing arts school at Islington's Ecclesbourne Primary School. 70 pupils came the first week, including future Birds of a Feather stars Pauline Quirke (aged 9), Linda Robson (aged 10) and Ray Burdis (aged 11).

In 1970, the classes moved across the road to a council hall in Bentham Court on Ecclesbourne Road. By 1975 she had 1,000 pupils and 5,000 on the waiting list, so moved to the custom converted mission hall on Barnsbury Road in 1976, when the performing arts school was established as an independent charity.

Scher's teaching style produces what critics call a natural delivery, but Scher comments that she just uses their natural voice. Of her improvisation technique, she told Simon Hattenstone of The Guardian in 2004:

In 2000, Scher suffered ill health and stepped down during her recovery period. Scher was never reinstated as head of the theatre, despite a vociferous campaign led by her and her supporters, The Friends of Anna Scher. In 2005, the remaining staff and board set up a new school but Anna Scher went on to continue her theatre school under her own name at the nearby Blessed Sacrament Church Hall, Islington. Since 2009, the Anna Scher Theatre has been teaching from the St Silas Church in Islington and classes are run 3 days a week by Anna Scher and former pupil Bernie Burdis, who together have taught for over 30 years.

Alumni

The school has trained many actors who went on to star in the soap opera EastEnders, including Martin Kemp, Gillian Taylforth, Patsy Palmer, Sid Owen, Natalie Cassidy, Jake Wood, Susan Tully, Tilly Vosburgh and Brooke Kinsella. Scher also trained Oscar-winning actor Daniel Kaluuya, and he thanked her in his BAFTA award winning speech.

References

Literature
 Anna Scher (1988), Desperate to Act, Collins, .
 Anna Scher & Charles Verrall (1975),100+ Ideas for Drama, Heinemann Educational, .
 Anna Scher & Charles Verrall (1976), First Act: Drama Kit, Ward Lock Educational, .
 Anna Scher & Charles Verrall (1987), Another 100+ Ideas for Drama, Heinemann Educational, .
 Anna Scher & Charles Verrall (1992), 200+ Ideas for Drama, Heinemann Educational, .

External links
 
 Official website for the Anna Scher Theatre Drama classes
 Official Agency website for the Anna Scher Theatre and Anna Scher

 
Drama schools in London
Education in the London Borough of Islington
Youth theatre companies
Performing groups established in 1968